Foudre Sportive d'Akonolinga  is a Cameroonian football club based in Akonolinga. They are a member of the Cameroonian Football Federation.

References 

Football clubs in Cameroon
Sports clubs in Cameroon